The following outline is provided as an overview of and topical guide to the U.S. state of Nebraska:

Nebraska – U.S. state located in the Great Plains of the Midwestern United States. Nebraska was once considered part of the Great American Desert, but it is now a leading farming and ranching state.

General reference 

 Names
 Common name: Nebraska
 Pronunciation: 
 Official name: State of Nebraska
 Abbreviations and name codes
 Postal symbol: NE
 ISO 3166-2 code: US-NE
 Internet second-level domain: .ne.us
 Nicknames
 Beef State (previously used on license plates)
 Cornhusker State (previously used on license plates)
 Tree Planter's State
 Adjectival: Nebraska
 Demonym: Nebraskan

Geography of Nebraska 

Geography of Nebraska
 Nebraska is: a U.S. state, a federal state of the United States of America
 Location
 Northern hemisphere
 Western hemisphere
 Americas
 North America
 Anglo America
 Northern America
 United States of America
 Contiguous United States
 Central United States
 Corn Belt
 West North Central States
 Midwestern United States
 Great plains
 Population of Nebraska: 1,826,341 (2010 U.S. Census)
 Area of Nebraska:
 Atlas of Nebraska

Places in Nebraska 

 Historic places in Nebraska
 National Historic Landmarks in Nebraska
 National Register of Historic Places listings in Nebraska
 Bridges on the National Register of Historic Places in Nebraska
 National Natural Landmarks in Nebraska
 National parks in Nebraska
 State parks in Nebraska

Environment of Nebraska 

 Climate of Nebraska
 Superfund sites in Nebraska
 Wildlife of Nebraska
 Fauna of Nebraska
 Birds of Nebraska

Natural geographic features of Nebraska 

 Lakes of Nebraska
 Rivers of Nebraska

Regions of Nebraska 

 Western Nebraska

Administrative divisions of Nebraska 

 The 93 counties of the state of Nebraska
 Municipalities in Nebraska
 Cities in Nebraska
 State capital of Nebraska:
 City nicknames in Nebraska
 List of villages in Nebraska
 Unincorporated communities in Nebraska
 List of Nebraska townships

Demography of Nebraska 

Demographics of Nebraska

Government and politics of Nebraska 

Politics of Nebraska
 Form of government: U.S. state government
 United States congressional delegations from Nebraska
 Nebraska State Capitol
 Elections in Nebraska
 Electoral reform in Nebraska
 Political party strength in Nebraska

Branches of the government of Nebraska 

Government of Nebraska

Executive branch of the government of Nebraska 
 Governor of Nebraska
 Lieutenant Governor of Nebraska
 Secretary of State of Nebraska
 State departments
 Nebraska Department of Roads

Legislative branch of the government of Nebraska 

 Nebraska Legislature (unicameral)

Judicial branch of the government of Nebraska 

Courts of Nebraska
 Supreme Court of Nebraska

Law and order in Nebraska 

 Law of Nebraska
 Cannabis in Nebraska
 Capital punishment  in Nebraska
 Individuals executed in Nebraska
 Constitution of Nebraska
 Crime in Nebraska
 Gun laws in Nebraska
 Law enforcement in Nebraska
 Law enforcement agencies in Nebraska

Military in Nebraska 

 Nebraska Air National Guard
 Nebraska Army National Guard

History of Nebraska 

History of Nebraska

History of Nebraska, by period 

Prehistory of Nebraska
French colony of Louisiane, 1699–1764
Treaty of Fontainebleau of 1762
Spanish (though predominantly Francophone) district of Alta Louisiana, 1764–1803
Third Treaty of San Ildefonso of 1800
French district of Haute-Louisiane, 1803
Louisiana Purchase of 1803
Unorganized U.S. territory created by the Louisiana Purchase, 1803–1804
Lewis and Clark Expedition, 1804–1806
District of Louisiana, 1804–1805
Territory of Louisiana, 1805–1812
Territory of Missouri, 1812–1821
War of 1812, June 18, 1812 – March 23, 1815
Treaty of Ghent, December 24, 1814
Unorganized Territory, 1821–1854
Mexican–American War, April 25, 1846 – February 2, 1848
Treaty of Fort Laramie of 1851
Nebraska Territory, 1854–1867
Kansas–Nebraska Act of 1854
History of slavery in Nebraska
Territory of Jefferson (extralegal), 1859–1861
Pony Express, 1860–1861
American Civil War, April 12, 1861 – May 13, 1865
Nebraska in the American Civil War
First Transcontinental Telegraph completed 1861
State of Nebraska becomes 37th State admitted to the United States of America on March 1, 1867
Gerald Ford becomes 38th President of the United States on August 9, 1974

History of Nebraska, by region 

 By city
 History of Lincoln, Nebraska
 History of Omaha, Nebraska
 History of North Omaha, Nebraska

History of Nebraska, by subject 

 History of slavery in Nebraska

Culture of Nebraska 

Culture of Nebraska
 Museums in Nebraska
 Religion in Nebraska
 Episcopal Diocese of Nebraska
 Scouting in Nebraska
 State symbols of Nebraska
 Flag of the State of Nebraska 
 Great Seal of the State of Nebraska

The Arts in Nebraska 
 Music of Nebraska

Sports in Nebraska 

Sports in Nebraska

Economy and infrastructure of Nebraska 

Economy of Nebraska
 Communications in Nebraska
 Newspapers in Nebraska
 Radio stations in Nebraska
 Television stations in Nebraska
 Energy in Nebraska
 List of power stations in Nebraska
 Solar power in Nebraska
 Wind power in Nebraska
 Health care in Nebraska
 Hospitals in Nebraska
 Transportation in Nebraska
 Airports in Nebraska

Education in Nebraska 

Education in Nebraska
 Schools in Nebraska
 School districts in Nebraska
 High schools in Nebraska
 Colleges and universities in Nebraska
 University of Nebraska

See also

Topic overview:
Nebraska

Index of Nebraska-related articles

References

External links 

Nebraska
Nebraska